Ellakvere is a village in Jõgeva Parish, Jõgeva County in eastern Estonia. The village is known for the garlic grown there.

Its EHAK (Eesti haldus- ja asustusjaotuse klassifikaator) code is 1582.

References

Further reading
 Kõpp, Juhan. Laiuse kihelkonna ajalugu. (History of Laiuse parish.) Eesti Kirjanduse Selts  (Estonian Literary Society), Tartu 1937.

Villages in Jõgeva County